"Death" is a song by American rapper Trippie Redd featuring fellow American rapper DaBaby. It was released on November 12, 2019 as the second single from his fourth commercial mixtape A Love Letter to You 4 (2019). The track was released under Trippie Redd's labels 1400 Entertainment and 10k Projects. Produced by from DJ Paul and TWhy Xclusive, the song samples "Hit A Muthafucka" by hip hop group Three 6 Mafia, which DJ Paul is part of.

Controversy 
In March 2020, Trippie Redd and DJ Paul was sued by Reginald Boyland, the owner of the record label On The Strength Records, for using the sample of "Hit A Muthafucka" in the song. In his lawsuit, Boyland stated that obtained the rights to the sampled song in a 2015 settlement with DJ Paul. Boyland claimed that "Hit A Muthafucka" sampled his track "Pimps in the House". According to Boyland, he also told both Paul and Redd that he owed a portion of "Death" profits but received no response.

Charts

Certifications

References 

2019 singles
2019 songs
Trippie Redd songs
DaBaby songs
Songs written by Trippie Redd
Songs written by DaBaby
Songs written by DJ Paul
Songs about death